The Bourse des Valeurs Mobilières de Tunis (BVMT) or Bourse de Tunis is a stock exchange based in Tunis, Tunisia. It was founded in 1969, and currently lists around 50 stocks.

The exchange is under the control of the state-run Financial Market Council. The government has provided tax breaks to increase the number of listings, but companies have been slow in going public.
The creation of the award was in February 1969. Although this creation is relatively old, the role of the stock market in financing Tunisia's economy has remained limited or insignificant due to the dominance of the state and banks . This results in significant levels of money creation and inflation.

This period is characterized by ease of access to bank loans and state aid, a very advantageous remuneration of deposits with banks that are regulated, protected and exempt income and a fairly heavy taxation of stock market investments.

The award will be increasingly seen as a registrar of transactions as a mirror of the economy having its place in the corporate finance. Moreover, the market capitalization represents just 1% of GDP at the end of 1986.

As part of the structural adjustment plan, a financial market reform started in 1988 with the aim of establishing a legal framework allowing the market to contribute to the financing of the economy. Deposits with banks are taxed, the rates of interest on deposits are falling as a result of lower inflation and savings in securities enjoys favorable taxation with the abolition of taxation on most -values and dividends. The tax on corporate profits also down 80% to 35%.
To meet international standards, reform is adopted with the promulgation of the Law of 14 November 1994 on the reorganization of financial market. This law creates the new public regulator: the Financial Market Council, which began operations on 15 November 1995. Following this major reform of the Tunis Stock Exchange that establishes the foundations of a financial market, potentially able to finance part of the economy, the situation continues to evolve fifty companies listed in March 2009, for a market capitalization of up to 8.7 billion dinars (against 3.1 billion in 2004) or 16% of national GDP.

Listed companies

Financials
Amen Bank
Arab Tunisian Bank
Banque Attijari de Tunisie
Banque de l'Habitat
Banque Internationale Arabe de Tunisie
Banque Nationale Agricole
Banque de Tunisie
Société Tunisienne de Banque
Banque de Tunisie et des Emirats
Union Bancaire pour le Commerce et l'Industrie
Union Internationale de Banques

Financial services
Arab Tunisian Lease
Attijari Leasing
Compagnie Internationale de Leasing
El Wifack Leasing
Tunisie Leasing
Placements de Tunisie - SICAF
Société de Placement et de Développement Industriel et Touristique - SICAF
Société Tunisienne d'Investissement à Capital Risqué
Poulina Group Holding
Modern Leasing

Insurance
Compagnie d'Assurances et de Réassurrances
Société Tunisienne d'Assurances et de Réassurances
Société d'Assurances Salim
La Société Tunisienne de Réassurance « TUNIS Re »

Telecommunication
Société Tunisienne d'Entreprises de Telecommunications
Servicom

General retailers
Automobile Réseau Tunisien et Services
Magasin Général
Société Nouvelle Maison de la Ville de Tunis
Société Tunisienne des Marchés de Gros
Ennalk Automobiles

Travel and leisure
Société Tunisienne de l'Air

Healthcare
Société Adwya
Société des Industries Pharmaceutiques de Tunisie

Consumer goods
Société l'Accumulateur Tunisien
Société Générale Industrielle de Filtration
Société Tunisienne d'Equipement
Société Tunisienne des Industries de Pneumatiques

Food and Beverage
Société Frigorifique et Brasserie de Tunis
Tunisie Lait
Société de Production Agricole de Teboulba

Personal and household goods
Electrostar

Construction and materials
Essoukna
Société Immobilière et de Participation
Société Immobilière Tuniso-Séoudienne
Société Moderne de Céramique
Les Ciments de Bizerte
Carthage Cement

Industrial goods and services
Société Industrielle d'Appareillage et de Matériels Electriques
Société Tunisienne de Verreries
One Tech Holding

Chemicals
Air Liquide Tunisie
Société Chimique
Société des Industries Chimiques du Fluor

Basic resources
Société Tunisie Profiles Aluminium

Oil and gas
Société de Transport des Hydrocarbures Par Pipelines

See also
List of African stock exchanges
List of stock exchanges

References

External links
Official website

1969 establishments in Tunisia
Stock exchanges in Africa
Companies of Tunisia
Organisations based in Tunis
Economy of Tunis